Besian Çeliku (born 18 July 1987, in Tiranë) is an Albanian football player.

Club career
Having started his career with KF Tirana, he was loaned out to Kastrioti Krujë, Përparimi Kukës and Skënderbeu Korçë before moving to KS Lushnja. He was also a member of the Albania U17 and  U21 national teams.

References

1987 births
Living people
Footballers from Tirana
Albanian footballers
Association football central defenders
Albania youth international footballers
Albania under-21 international footballers
KF Tirana players
KS Kastrioti players
FK Kukësi players
KF Skënderbeu Korçë players
KS Lushnja players